Planning is the process of thinking regarding the activities required to achieve a desired goal. Planning is based on foresight, the fundamental capacity for mental time travel. The evolution of forethought, the capacity to think ahead, is considered to have been a prime mover in human evolution. Planning is a fundamental property of intelligent behavior. It involves the use of logic and imagination to visualise not only a desired end result, but the steps necessary to achieve that result.

An important aspect of planning is its relationship to forecasting. Forecasting aims to predict what the future will look like, while planning imagines what the future could look like.

Planning according to established principles is a core part of many professional occupations, particularly in fields such as management and business. Once a plan has been developed, it is possible to measure and assess progress, efficiency and effectiveness. As circumstances change, plans may need to be modified or even abandoned.

Psychology

Planning is one of the executive functions of the brain, encompassing the neurological processes involved in the formulation, evaluation and selection of a sequence of thoughts and actions to achieve a desired goal. Various studies utilizing a combination of neuropsychological, neuropharmacological and functional neuroimaging approaches have suggested there is a positive relationship between impaired planning ability and damage to the frontal lobe.

A specific area within the mid-dorsolateral frontal cortex located in the frontal lobe has been implicated as playing an intrinsic role in both cognitive planning and associated executive traits such as working memory.

Disruption of the neural pathways, via various mechanisms such as traumatic brain injury, or the effects of neurodegenerative diseases between this area of the frontal cortex and the basal ganglia, specifically the striatum (corticostriatal pathway), may disrupt the processes required for normal planning function.

Individuals who were born very low birth weight (<1500 grams) and extremely low birth weight are at greater risk for various cognitive deficits including planning ability.№

Neuropsychological tests

There are a variety of neuropsychological tests which can be used to measure variance of planning ability between the subject and controls.

 Tower of Hanoi, a puzzle invented in 1883 by the French mathematician Édouard Lucas. There are different variations of the puzzle: the classic version consists of three rods and usually seven to nine discs of subsequently smaller size. Planning is a key component of the problem-solving skills necessary to achieve the objective, which is to move the entire stack to another rod, obeying the following rules:
 Only one disk may be moved at a time.
 Each move consists of taking the upper disk from one of the rods and sliding it onto another rod, on top of the other disks that may already be present on that rod.
 No disk may be placed on top of a smaller disk.

 Tower of London is another test that was developed in 1992 by Tim Shallice specifically to detect deficits in planning as may occur with damage to the frontal lobe. Test participants with damage to the left anterior frontal lobe demonstrated planning deficits (i.e., greater number of moves required for solution).

Test participants with damage to the right anterior, and left or right posterior areas of the frontal lobes, showed no impairment. The results implicating the left anterior frontal lobes involvement in solving the Tower of London were supported in concomitant neuroimaging studies which also showed a reduction in regional cerebral blood flow to the left pre-frontal lobe. For the number of moves, a significant negative correlation was observed for the left prefrontal area: i.e. subjects that took more time planning their moves showed greater activation in the left prefrontal area.

Planning theories

Business 

Patrick Montana and Bruce Charnov outline a three-step result-oriented process for planning: 
 Choosing a destination
 Evaluating alternative routes
 Deciding the specific course of the plan
In organizations, planning can become a management process, concerned with defining goals for a future direction and determining on the missions and resources to achieve those targets. To meet the goals, managers may develop plans such as a business plan or a marketing plan. Planning always has a purpose. The purpose may involve the achievement of certain goals or targets: efficient use of resources, reducing risk, expanding the organisation and its assets, etc.

Public policy 
Public policies include laws, rules, decisions, and decrees. Public policy can be defined as efforts to tackle social issues via policymaking. A policy is crafted with a specific goal in mind in order to address a societal problem that has been prioritized by the government.

Public policy planning includes environmental, land use, regional, urban and spatial planning. In many countries, the operation of a town and country planning system is often referred to as "planning" and the professionals which operate the system are known as "planners".

It is a conscious as well as sub-conscious activity. It is "an anticipatory decision making process" that helps in coping with complexities. It is deciding future course of action from amongst alternatives. It is a process that involves making and evaluating each set of interrelated decisions. It is selection of missions, objectives and "translation of knowledge into action." A planned performance brings better results compared to an unplanned one. A manager's job is planning, monitoring and controlling. Planning and goal setting are important traits of an organization. It is done at all levels of the organization. Planning includes the plan, the thought process, action, and implementation. Planning gives more power over the future. Planning is deciding in advance what to do, how to do it, when to do it, and who should do it. This bridges the gap from where the organization is to where it wants to be. The planning function involves establishing goals and arranging them in logical order. An organization that plans well achieves faster goals than one that does not plan before implementation.

Personal
Planning is not just a professional activity: it is a feature of everyday life, whether for career advancement, organising an event or even just getting through a busy day.

Alternatives to planning 
Opportunism can supplement or replace planning.

Types of planning

 Automated planning and scheduling
 Business plan
 Central planning
 Collaborative planning, forecasting, and replenishment
 Comprehensive planning
 Contingency planning
 Economic planning
 Enterprise architecture planning
 Environmental planning
 Event planning
 Family planning
 Financial planning
 Land use planning
 Landscape planning
 Lesson planning
 Marketing plan
 Network resource planning
 Operational planning
 Planning Domain Definition Language
 Regional planning
 Site planning
 Spatial planning
 Strategic planning
 Succession planning
 Time management
 Urban planning

See also

 Futures studies
 Learning theory (education)
 Planning fallacy
 Project management
 Time management

References

Further reading 

 
 Bazin, A. (2012). Bilateral and multilateral planning: Best practices and lessons learned. Strategos.
 Das, J P, Binod C Kar, Rauno K Parrila. Cognitive Planning: The Psychological Basis of Intelligent Behaviour. Sage Publications Pvt. Ltd; illustrated edition. English  
 
 
 
 
 Yiftachel, Oren, 1995, "The Dark Side of Modernism: Planning as Control of an Ethnic Minority," in Sophie Watson and Katherine Gibson, eds., Postmodern Cities and Spaces (Oxford and Cambridge, MA: Blackwell), pp. 216–240.
 
 

Neuropsychological assessment
 
Systems engineering